Oligodendrocyte transcription factor 1 is a protein that in humans is encoded by the OLIG1 gene.

See also 
 Oligodendrocyte
 Transcription factor
 OLIG2

References

Further reading

External links 
 

Transcription factors